Azapetine is a vasodilator.

References 

Dibenzazepines